Jefferson is a city in Marion County, in the U.S. state of Texas's northeastern region. With a population of 1,875 at the 2020 United States census, it is the county seat of Marion.

History
Almost every commercial building and house on the main arterial road in Jefferson has a historic marker.

Early records indicate that Jefferson was founded around 1841 on land ceded from the Caddo Indians. At that time, a log jam more than 100 miles long existed on the Red River north of present Natchitoches, Louisiana. The Indians said that this log jam, known as the Great Red River Raft, had always existed.

The Red River Raft (or Great Raft) acted as a dam on the river and raised the level of Caddo Lake and the Red River several feet. This rise of Caddo Lake and the corresponding rise in the Big Cypress Bayou at Jefferson permitted commercial riverboat travel to Jefferson from ports such as St. Louis and New Orleans via the Mississippi and Red Rivers.

Jefferson was one of the most important ports in Texas between 1845 and 1872. The town reached its peak population just a few years after the Civil War and is reported to have exceeded 30,000. During this time, Jefferson was the sixth-largest town in Texas.

There were attempts over the years to remove the raft and permit the normal flow of the Red River, but these attempts were unsuccessful until the discovery of nitroglycerin. In 1873, using nitroglycerin, the Army Corps of Engineers was finally able to clear the raft from the Red River.  This lowered the level of Caddo Lake and Big Cypress to the extent that riverboat traffic to Jefferson was no longer commercially feasible. At the peak of river traffic, Jefferson had a population of over 7,000. A few years later, it had dropped to a little over 3,000.

The Sterne Fountain was given to the city in 1913 to honor the contribution of Jacob and Ernestine Sterne, a Jewish couple who settled in Jefferson before the Civil War and became prominent citizens who managed the post office and were involved in numerous civic and cultural projects. The fountain includes a statue of Hebe, the Greek goddess of Youth, by Giuseppe Moretti.

One of the legends related to Jefferson referred to Jay Gould, the railroad magnate. The legend goes that Gould wanted to bring his railroad through Jefferson but the town leaders refused because they had the river traffic. Gould said that "grass would grow in the streets" without the railroad. Gould credited with supporting the removal of the Red River Raft and the subsequent decline of Jefferson as a river port. Much of this tale is fiction. Townspeople obtained Gould's railcar and it is displayed as a tourist attraction in downtown Jefferson.

Since 2000, Jefferson has been the location for the Pulpwood Queens Book Club Girlfriend Weekend's annual conference, attracting authors from all around the country.
Home of the famous TJ Blackburn Syrup Works since 1927.

Geography

Climate
The climate in this area is characterized by hot, humid summers and generally mild to cool winters. According to the Köppen Climate Classification system, Jefferson has a humid subtropical climate, abbreviated "Cfa" on climate maps.

Demographics

In the 2010 U.S. census, there were 2,199 people, 871 households, and 544 families residing in the city. The population density was 465.7 people per square mile (179.6/km2). There were 1,042 housing units at an average density of 239.7 per square mile (92.5/km2). At the 2020 census, its population decreased to 1,875. The racial makeup of the city in 2010 was 62.80% White, 34.68% African American, 0.40% Native American, 0.84% Asian, 0.05% Pacific Islander, 0.54% from other races, and 0.69% from two or more races. Hispanic or Latino of any race were 1.63% of the population; in 2020, its racial and ethnic makeup remained predominantly non-Hispanic white. The city's racial makeup in 2018 was 50.2% non-Hispanic white and 41.5% Black or African American. 2.4% were of two or more races, and 5.9% from some other race; 7.3% were from Hispanic or Latino heritage from any race.

At the 2000 census, the median income for a household in the city was $17,034, and the median income for a family was $26,250. Males had a median income of $28,929 versus $14,583 for females. The per capita income for the city was $15,558. About 29.4% of families and 32.9% of the population were below the poverty line, including 54.1% of those under age 18 and 22.7% of those age 65 or over. At the American Community Survey of 2020, its median household income was $40,306 with a mean income at $67,961.

Education
The city of Jefferson is served by the Jefferson Independent School District.

Notable people

 Diamond Bessie (1854–1877), 19th Century murder victim
 Vernon Dalhart, popular singer and songwriter of the first half of the 1900s, member of Country Music Hall of Fame
 Montrae Holland, NFL player, 2003–2011
 Robert Taylor, aka "Pigskin Bob" (1964 - present), Co-founder of the Friday Night Scoreboard Show, Popular radio personality, four-time National Association of Broadcasters Marconi Medium Market Personality of the Year Finalists, Member of the East Texas Coaches Association Hall of Famer, 2018, Founder of the Totally Awesome List, Jefferson High School graduate.
 Robert Potter, Secretary of the Navy during the Texas Revolution
 Rafael Robinson, NFL player, 1992–1997
 Bobbie Williams, NFL player, 2000–2013 Super Bowl Champion (XLVII)

See also

The Grove
Jefferson Jimplecute
Texas and Pacific Railway

References

Further reading
 Bagur, Jacques D. Antebellum Jefferson, Texas: Everyday Life in an East Texas Town (Denton: University of North Texas Press, 2012). 612 pp.

External links

 Article on Jefferson, Texas at the Handbook of Texas online.
 Marion County Chamber of Commerce for visitor information
 Official Tourism Site for Jefferson, TX

 
Cities in Marion County, Texas
Cities in Texas
County seats in Texas